The 20th Annual Latin Grammy Awards was held on Thursday, November 14, 2019, at the MGM Grand Garden Arena in Las Vegas, Nevada and was broadcast on Univision. The telecast marked the 20th anniversary of the Latin Grammy Awards and honored outstanding achievements in Latin music released from June 1, 2018, to May 31, 2019.

Juanes was honored as the Latin Recording Academy Person of the Year on the night prior to the telecast. Thalía was honored with the President's Merit Award for her achievements and outstanding contribution in Latin music.

Nominations were announced on September 24, 2019. Spanish singer-songwriter Alejandro Sanz led nominations with eight. Rosalía and Alejandro Sanz had the most wins with three awards each.

Performers 
 Anitta, Milly Quezada, Tony Succar and Olga Tañón  —  "La Vida Es Un Carnaval"
Carlos Rivera, Leonel García and Reik — "Querida"
Calibre 50, Natalia Jiménez and Prince Royce  — "Secreto de Amor"
 Beto Cuevas, Fito Páez and Draco Rosa — "De Música Ligera"
 Paula Arenas  — "Ahora Soy Libre"
 Sech, Darell and Ozuna — "Otro Trago" / "Si Te Vas"
Intocable — "No Van A Entender"
 Alejandro Sanz, Aitana, Greeicy and Nella — "Mi Persona Favorita"
 Rosalía — "A Palé" / "Con Altura"
Alex Fernández, Alejandro Fernández and Vicente Fernández — "Volver, Volver"
 Fonseca — "Perdóname" 
 Alicia Keys, Miguel, Pedro Capó  and Farruko — "Show Me Love" / "Calma"
Juanes — "Fíjate Bien" / "Querer Mejor" (with Alessia Cara) / "A Dios Le Pido" / "Bonita" (with Sebastián Yatra) / "La Camisa Negra" 10:52
Luis Fonsi — "Aquí Estoy Yo" / "Imposible" 
Pepe Aguilar — "El Triste" 
Ricky Martin, Residente and Bad Bunny — "Cántalo"
Ozuna — "Amor Genuino" / "Hasta Que Salga El Sol"
Ximena Sariñana and Los Ángeles Azules — "Cobarde" / "Mis Sentimientos"
Sebastián Yatra and Reik — "Un Año"
Bad Bunny  — "Callaita"

Winners and Nominees
The following is the list of nominees. Winners are highlighted in bold.

General
Record of the Year
Alejandro Sanz and Camila Cabello — "Mi Persona Favorita"

Alfonso Pérez, Julio Reyes Copello & Alejandro Sanz, record producers; Nicolás De La Espriella, Carlos Fernando López, Alfonso Pérez, Natalia Ramírez, Nicolás Ramírez & Julio Reyes Copello, recording engineers; Trevor Lyle Muzzy, mixer; Gene Grimaldi, mastering engineer
Marc Anthony — "Parecen Viernes"
Marc Anthony & Sergio George, record producers; Carlos Álvarez, Juan Mario Aracil "Mayito", Natalia Ramírez & Julio Reyes Copello, recording engineers; Carlos Álvarez & Juan Mario Aracil "Mayito", mixers; Adam Ayan & Michael Fuller, mastering engineers
Andrés Calamaro — "Verdades Afiladas"
Gustavo Borner, record producer; Gustavo Borner, recording engineer; Gustavo Borner, mixer; Eric Boulanger, mastering engineer
Vicente García — "Ahí Ahí"
Eduardo Cabra & Vicente García, record producers; José Victor Olivier, Daniel Sanint & Harold Wendell Sanders, recording engineers; Fab Dupont, mixer; Diego Calviño, mastering engineer
Juan Luis Guerra y 4.40 — "Kitipun"
Juan Luis Guerra & Janina Rosado, record producers; Allan Leschhorn & Simon Rhodes, recording engineers; Allan Leschhorn, mixer; Adam Ayan, mastering engineer
Juanes and Alessia Cara — "Querer Mejor"
Rafa Arcaute, Juanes & Tainy, producers; Alejandro Patiño & Orlando Vitto, recording engineers; Jaycen Joshua, mixer; Dave Kutch, mastering engineer
Juanes and Lalo Ebratt — "La Plata"
Mauricio Rengifo & Andrés Torres, record producers; Mauricio Rengifo & Andrés Torres, recording engineers; Jaycen Joshua, mixer; Dave Kutch, mastering engineer
Rosalía — "Aute Cuture"
El Guincho & Rosalía, record producers; El Guincho, recording engineer; Jaycen Joshua, mixer; Chris Athens, mastering engineer
Alejandro Sanz — "No Tengo Nada"
Alfonso Pérez, Julio Reyes Copello & Alejandro Sanz, record producers; Nicolás De La Espriella, Carlos Fernando López, Alfonso Pérez, Natalia Ramírez, Nicolás Ramírez & Julio Reyes Copello, recording engineers; Trevor Lyle Muzzy, mixer; Gene Grimaldi, mastering engineer
Ximena Sariñana — "Cobarde"
Mauricio Rengifo & Andrés Torres, record producers; Mauricio Rengifo & Andrés Torres, recording engineers; Jaycen Joshua, mixer; Dave Kutch, mastering engineer

Album of the Year
Rosalía — El Mal Querer

El Guincho & Rosalía, album producers; El Guincho, album recording engineer; Jaycen Joshua, album mixer; Antón Álvarez Alfaro, El Guincho & Rosalía, songwriters; Chris Athens, album mastering engineer
Paula Arenas — Visceral
Julio Reyes Copello, album producer; Nicolás de la Espriella, Carlos Fernando López, Ricardo López Lalinde, Natalia Ramírez & Julio Reyes Copello, album recording engineers; Nicolás Ramírez, album mixer; Paula Arenas & Julio Reyes Copello, songwriters; Antonio Baglio & Robin Reumers, album mastering engineers
Rubén Blades — Paraíso Road Gang
Luis Enrique Becerra & Rubén Blades, album producers; Luis Enrique Becerra & José Ramón Guerra, album recording engineers; Luis Enrique Becerra & Rubén Blades, album mixers; Rubén Blades, songwriter; Geoff Pesche, album mastering engineer
Andrés Calamaro — Cargar la Suerte
Gustavo Borner, album producer; Gustavo Borner, album recording engineer; Gustavo Borner, album mixer; Andrés Calamaro & German Wiedemer, songwriters; Gustavo Borner, album mastering engineer
Fonseca — Agustín
Fonseca, album producer; Andrés Borda, album recording engineer; Iker Gastaminza & Trevor Lyle Muzzy, album mixers; Fonseca, songwriter; Dave Kutch, album mastering engineer
Luis Fonsi — Vida
Mauricio Rengifo & Andrés Torres, album producers; Luis Fonsi, Mauricio Rengifo & Andrés Torres, album recording engineers; Jaycen Joshua, album mixer; Luis Fonsi, Mauricio Rengifo & Andrés Torres, songwriters; Dave Kutch, album mastering engineer
Alejandro Sanz — #ElDisco
Alfonso Pérez, Julio Reyes Copello & Alejandro Sanz, album producers; Nicolás De La Espriella, Carlos Fernando Lopez, Alfonso Pérez, Natalia Ramírez, Nicolás Ramírez & Julio Reyes Copello, album recording engineers; Trevor Lyle Muzzy, album mixer; Alejandro Sanz, songwriter; Gene Grimaldi, album mastering engineer
Ximena Sariñana — ¿Dónde Bailarán las Niñas?
Juan Pablo Vega, album producer; Daniel Bitrán Arizpe, album recording engineer; Alejandro Patiño, album mixer; Ximena Sariñana & Juan Pablo Vega, songwriters; Alejandro Patiño, album mastering engineer
Tony Succar — Más de Mi
Marc Quiñones & Tony Succar, album producers; Santiago Diaz, Nestor Rigaud & Tony Succar, album recording engineers; Alfredo Matheus, album mixer; Jorge Luis Piloto & Tony Succar, songwriters; Michael Fuller, album mastering engineer
Sebastián Yatra — Fantasía
Mauricio Rengifo & Andrés Torres, album producers; Nicolas Ladrón De Guevara, Mauricio Rengifo & Andrés Torres, album recording engineers; Jaycen Joshua, album mixer; Mauricio Rengifo, Andrés Torres & Sebastián Yatra, songwriters; Dave Kutch, album mastering engineer

Song of the Year
"Calma" — Pedro Capó, Gabriel Edgar González Pérez & George Noriega, songwriters (Pedro Capó)
 "Desconstrução" — Tiago Iorc, songwriter (Tiago Iorc)
 "El País" — Rubén Blades, songwriter (Rubén Blades)
 "Kitipun" — Juan Luis Guerra, songwriter (Juan Luis Guerra 4.40)
 "Mi Persona Favorita" — Camila Cabello and Alejandro Sanz, songwriters (Alejandro Sanz and Camila Cabello)
 "No Tengo Nada" — Alejandro Sanz, songwriter (Alejandro Sanz)
 "Quédate" — Kany García and Tommy Torres, songwriters (Kany García and Tommy Torres)
 "Querer Mejor" — Rafael Arcaute, Alessia Cara, Camilo Echeverry, Juanes, Mauricio Montaner, Ricardo Montaner and Tainy, songwriters (Juanes and Alessia Cara)
 "Un Año" — Mauricio Rengifo, Andrés Torres and Sebastián Yatra, songwriters (Sebastián Yatra Featuring Reik)
 "Ven" — Fonseca, songwriter (Fonseca)

Best New Artist
Nella
Aitana
 Burning Caravan
 Cami
 Fer Casillas
 Chipi Chacón
Elsa y Elmar
Greeicy
 Juan Ingaramo
Paulo Londra

Pop
Best Contemporary Pop Vocal Album
Rosalía — El Mal Querer
Ricardo Montaner — Montaner
Morat — Balas Perdidas
 Alejandro Sanz — #ElDisco
 Sebastián Yatra — Fantasía

Best Traditional Pop Vocal Album
Fonseca — Agustín
 Paula Arenas — Visceral
 Cami — Rosa
 Camila — Hacia Adentro
Pavel Núñez — Sentimientos

Best Pop Song
"Mi Persona Favorita" — Alejandro Sanz and Camila Cabello, songwriters (Alejandro Sanz and Camila Cabello)
 "Bailar" — Leonel García, songwriter (Leonel García) 
 "Buena Para Nada" — Paula Arenas, Luigi Castillo and Santiago Castillo, songwriters (Paula Arenas)
 "Pienso en tu Mirá" — Antón Álvarez Alfaro, El Guincho and Rosalía, songwriters (Rosalía)
 "Ven" — Fonseca, songwriter (Fonseca)

Urban
Best Urban Fusion/Performance
Pedro Capó and Farruko — "Calma (Remix)"
Bad Bunny — "Tenemos Que Hablar"
ChocQuibtown, Zion & Lennox, Farruko featuring Manuel Turizo — "Pa' Olvidarte"
Daddy Yankee featuring Snow — "Con Calma"
Sech featuring Darell — "Otro Trago"

Best Urban Music Album
Bad Bunny — X 100pre
Anitta — Kisses
De La Ghetto — Mi Movimiento
Feid — 19
Sech — Sueños

Best Urban Song
"Con Altura" — J Balvin, Mariachi Budda, Frank Dukes, Teo Halm, El Guincho, Alejandro Ramirez and Rosalía, songwriters (Rosalía and J Balvin featuring El Guincho)
"Baila Baila Baila" — Ozuna and Vicente Saavedra, songwriters (Ozuna)
 "Caliente" — J Balvin, Rene Cano, De La Ghetto and Alejandro Ramirez, songwriters (De La Ghetto featuring J Balvin
 "Otro Trago" — Kevyn Mauricio Cruz, Kevin Mauricio Jimenez Londoño, Bryan Lezcano Chaverra, Josh Mendez, Sech and Jorge Valdes, songwriters (Sech featuring Darell)
 "Pa' Olvidarte" — René Cano, ChocQuibtown, Kevyn Cruz Moreno, Juan Diego Medina Vélez, Andrés David Restrepo, Mateo Tejada Giraldo, Andrés Uribe Marín, Juan Vargas & Doumbia Yohann, songwriters (ChocQuibtown)

Rock
Best Rock Album
Draco Rosa — Monte Sagrado
A.N.I.M.A.L — Una Razon Para Seguir
 Arawato — Arawato
 Carajo — Basado en hechos reales
Molotov — MTV Unplugged: El Desconecte

Best Pop/Rock Album
Andrés Calamaro — Cargar la Suerte
Jumbo — Manual de Viaje A Un Lugar Lejano
David Lebón — Lebón & Co.
Leiva — Nuclear
Taburete — Madam Ayahuasca

Best Rock Song
"Verdades Afiladas"   — Andrés Calamaro and German Wiedemer, songwriters (Andrés Calamaro) 
 "Conectar" — Rodrigo Crespo, songwriter (Rodrigo Crespo)
 "Gozilla" — Leiva, songwriter (Leiva featuring Enrique Bunbury and Ximena Sariñana)
 "Nirvana" — Arawato, songwriters (Arawato)
 "Punta Cana" — Roberto Musso, songwriter (El Cuarteto de Nos)

Alternative
Best Alternative Music Album
Mon Laferte — Norma
Alex Anwandter — Latinoamericana
Babasónicos — Discutible
Bandalos Chinos — Bach
Marilina Bertoldi — Prender Un Fuego

Best Alternative Song
"Tócamela" — David Julca, Jonathan Julca, Los Amigos Invisibles, Silverio Lozada and Servando Primera, songwriters (Los Amigos Invisibles)
 "Causa Perdida" — El David Aguilar, songwriter (El David Aguilar)
 "Contra Todo" — Ismael Cancel and ILE, songwriters (ILE)
 "Cuentas Claras" — Kevin Johansen, songwriter (Kevin Johansen)
 "La Pregunta" — Adrián Dárgelos Rodríguez, songwriter (Babasónicos)

Tropical
Best Salsa Album
Tony Succar — Mas De Mi
Maite Hontelé — Cuba Linda
 Mario Ortiz All Star Band — 55 Aniversario
Eddie Palmieri — Mi Luz Mayor
 Quintero's Salsa Project — Nuestro Hogar

Best Cumbia/Vallenato Album
Puerto Candelaria and Juancho Valencia — Yo Me Llamo Cumbia
Checo Acosta — Checo Acosta 30 (Live)
 Diego Daza y Carlos Rueda — Esto Que Dice!
 Juan Piña — Para Mis Maestros Con Respeto
 Various Artists — Raíces

Best Traditional Tropical Album
Andrés Cepeda — Andrés Cepeda Big Band (Live)
 Olga Cerpa y Mestisay — Vereda Tropical
 Yelsy Heredia — Lo Nuestro
Aymée Nuviola — A Journey Through Cuban Music
 Septeto Acarey — La Llave Del Son

Best Contemporany Tropical/Tropical Fusion Album
Juan Luis Guerra 4.40 — Literal
 Iván Barrios — Barrios De Mi Tierra (Rubén Blade's songs)
Vicente García — Candela
Ilegales — Tropicalia
Milly Quezada — Milly & Company

Best Tropical Song
"Kitipun" — Juan Luis Guerra, songwriter (Juan Luis Guerra 4.40)
 "El Afortunado" — Luis Enrique and Jorge Luis Piloto, songwriters (Septeto Acarey featuring Luis Enrique)
 "Mas de Mi" — Jorge Luis Piloto and Tony Succar, songwriters (Tony Succar featuring Angel López)
 "Subiendo y Bajando" — Bobby Allende, Waddys Jáquez, David Maldonado and Adan Pérez, songwriters (8 y Más featuring Rubén Blades)
 "Vivir Es Complicado" — Jorge Luis Piloto, songwriters (Andrés Cepeda and Dayhan Díaz)

Songwriter
Best Singer-Songwriter Album
Kany García — Contra el Viento
 Albita — Acústica
Leonel García — Amor Presente
Kevin Johansen — Algo Ritmos
Gian Marco — Intuición

Regional Mexican
Best Ranchero/Mariachi Album
Christian Nodal — Ahora
 El Bebeto — Mi Persona Preferida
 Alex Fernández — Sigue La Dinastía...
Vicente Fernández — Más Romántico Que Nunca
 Flor De Toloache — Indestructible

Best Banda Album
Banda Los Sebastianes — A Través Del Vaso
 Saul El Jaguar Alarcón — Para Que No Te Lo Imagines
 El Mimoso — 25 Años Vol 1
 La Explosiva Banda De Maza — Un Tributo Al Sol
 Edwin Luna y La Trakalosa De Monterrey — Me Hiciste Un Borracho

Best Tejano Album
Elida Reyna y Avante — Colores
 El Plan — Siete
 Lucky Joe — Tu Príncipe
 David Lee Rodriquez — Así Me Enseñaron
 Vidal — Nunca Te Rindas

Best Norteño Album
Intocable — Percepción
 Bronco — Por Más
 Buyuchek — Las Canciones De La Abuela
 Calibre 50 — Mitad y Mitad
 La Maquinaria Norteña — Amo

Best Regional Song
"No Te Contaron Mal" — Edgar Barrera, Gussy Lau and Christian Nodal, songwriters (Christian Nodal)
 "Alguien Mejor Que Yo" — Jose Luis Roma, songwriter (Bronco)
 "Besos De Mezcal" — Shae Fiol, Camilo Lara and Mireya Ramos, songwriters  (Flor De Toloache)
 "De Los Besos Que Te Di" — José Esparza and Gussy Lau, songwriters (Christian Nodal)
"Te Amaré" — Manuel Monterrosas, songwriter (Alex Fernández)

Instrumental
Best Instrumental Album
Gustavo Casenave — Balance
 Cuban Sax Quintet — Saxofones Live Sessions
 Edu Ribeiro, Fábio Peron and Toninho Ferragutti — Folia De Treis
 Moisés P. Sánchez — Unbalanced Concerto For Ensemble
 Miguel Zenón featuring Spektral Quartet — Yo Soy La Tradición

Traditional
Best Folk Album
Luis Enrique + C4 Trio — Tiempo Al Tiempo
 Eva Ayllon — 48 Años Después
 Canalón De Timbiquí — De Mar y Río
 Cimarrón — Orinoco
 Luis Cobos Con The Royal Philharmonic Orchestra and El Mariachi Juvenil Tecalitlán — ¡Va Por México!

Best Tango Album
Quinteto Astor Piazzolla — Revolucionario
 Daniel Binelli y Nick Danielson — Marrón y Azul
 Enrique Campos — Roto
 Bernardo Monk — Atípico
 Pablo Ziegler Chamber Quartet — Radiotango

Jazz
Best Latin Jazz Album
Chucho Valdés — Jazz Batá 2
 Claudia Acuña — Turning Pages
 Branly, Ruiz & Haslip — Elemental
 Dos Orientales — Tercer Viaje
 André Marques — Rio - São Paulo

Christian
Best Christian Album (Spanish Language)
Juan Delgado — Todo Pasa
 Danilo Montero — Mi Viaje (Live)
 Gabriela Soto and Big Band — Lluvias De Bendición
 Ricardo Torres y Su Mariachi — Padre Mio
 Alex Zurdo — ¿Quién Contra Nosotros?

Best Christian Album (Portuguese Language)
Delino Marçal — Guarda Meu Coração
 Priscilla Alcântara — Gente
 Adriana Arydes — Sagrado
 Preto No Branco — Preto No Branco 3
 Eli Soares — 360º

Portuguese Language 
Best Portuguese Language Contemporary Pop Album
Anavitória — O Tempo É Agora
 As Bahias e a Cozinha Mineira — Tarântula
 Ana Cañas — Todxs
 Mahmundi — Para Dias Ruins
 Jair Oliveira — Selfie

Best Portuguese Language Rock or Alternative Album
BaianaSystem — O Futuro Não Demora
 The Baggios — Vulcão
 Chal — O Céu Sobre A Cabeça
 Liniker e Os Caramelows — Goela Abaixo
 Pitty — Matriz

Best Samba/Pagode Album
Mart'nália — Mart'nália Canta Vinicius De Moraes
 Nego Álvaro — Canta Sereno E Moa
 Monarco — De Todos Os Tempos
 Péricles — Em Sua Direção
 Anaí Rosa — Anaí Rosa Atraca Geraldo Pereira

Best MPB Album
Gilberto Gil — Ok Ok Ok
 Zeca Baleiro — O Amor No Caos
 Nana Caymmi — Canta Tito Madi
 Zélia Duncan — Tudo é Um
 Delia Fischer — Tempo Mínimo
 Jards Macalé — Besta Fera

Best Sertaneja Music Album
Marília Mendonça — Em Todos os Cantos
 Paula Fernandes — Hora Certa
 Francis & Felipe — Francis & Felipe
 Luan Santana — Live Movel
 Mano Walter — Ao Vivo em São Paulo

Best Portuguese Language Roots Album
Hermeto Pascoal — Hermeto Pascoal E Sua Visão Original Do Forró
 Foli Griô Orquestra — Ajo
 Alessandra Leão — Macumbas E Catimbós
 Elba Ramalho — O Ouro Do Pó Da Estrada
 Zé Mulato e Cassiano — Rei Caipira

Best Portuguese Language Song
"Desconstrução"

Tiago Iorc, songwriter  (Tiago Iorc)
 "Ansiosos Pra Viver"
 Mestrinho, songwriters (Mestrinho)
 "Etérea"
 Criolo, songwriter  (Criolo)
 "Mil e Uma"
 Arnaldo Antunes and Claudia Brant, songwriters (Claudia Brant featuring Arnaldo Antunes)
 "Sem Palavras"
 Mário Laginha and João Monge, songwriters (António Zambujo)

Children's
Best Latin Children’s Album
The Lucky Band  — Buenos Diaz
 Claraluna  — Luces, Cámara, Acción
 Sonia De Los Santos — ¡Alegría!
 Payasitas Nifu Nifa — Bim Bom Bam!
 123 Andrés — Canta Las Letras

Classical
Best Classical Album
Samuel Torres and La Nueva Filarmonía — Regreso
 Claudio Constantini — America
 Edith Ruiz — Árboles De Vidrio
 National Symphony Orchestra Of Cuba — Cuba: The Legacy
 Orquesta Sinfónica De Heredia — Solosh

Arrangement
Best Arrangement
Sirena

Rodner Padilla, arranger  (Luis Enrique + C4 Trio)
 Red Wall (Va A Caer)
 Otmaro Ruiz, arranger (Branly, Ruiz & Haslip)
 Mariachitlán
 Juan Pablo Contreras, arranger (Juan Pablo Contreras, Marco Parisotto and Orquesta Filarmónica De Jalisco)
 Loko De Amor
 Pablo Cebrián and Ketama, arranger (Ketama)
 Imprevisto
 César Orozco, arranger (Raices Jazz Orchestra, Pablo Gil and Tony Succar)

Recording Package
Best Recording Package
El Mal Querer

Man Mourentan and Tamara Pérez, art directors (Rosalía)
 Anónimas y Resilientes
 Luisa María Arango, Carlos Dussán, Manuel García-Orozco and Juliana Jaramillo-Buenaventura, art directors (Voces Del Bullerengue)
 Astronauta
 Emilio Lorente, art director (Zahara)
 Lição #2: Dorival
 Deborah Salles, art directors (Quartabê)
 Nuclear
 Boa Mistura, art directors (Leiva)

Production
Best Engineered Album
El Mal Querer

El Guincho and Brian Hernández, engineers; Jaycen Joshua, mixer; Chris Athens, mastering engineer (Rosalía)
 Anaí Rosa Atraca Geraldo Pereira
 Carlos Lima and Gilberto Monte, engineers; Carlos Lima, mixer; Carlos Lima, mastering engineer (Anaí Rosa)
 Bach
 Zac Hernández and Jerry Ordoñez, engineers; Jack Lahana, mixer; Chab, mastering engineer (Bandalos Chinos)
 Encontros
 Roger Freret, engineer; Marcelo Sabóia, mixer; Ron McMaster, mastering engineer (Antonio Adolfo Featuring Orquestra Atlantica)
 Montaner
 Jan Holzner, David Julca, Jonathan Julca, Jon Leone, Carlos Fernando López, Ricardo López Lalinde, Yasmil Marrufo, Darío Moscatelli, Quaz & Tainy, engineers; Jaycen Joshua, mixer; Mike Bozzi, mastering engineer (Ricardo Montaner)

Producer of the Year
Tony Succar
 Amante Del Amor (Raul Stefano) 
 El Alacrán (Eric Chacón and Tony Succar) 
 El Ritmo De Mi Corazón (Gian Marco Featuring Grupo 5, Tony Succar) 
 Imprevisto (Raices Jazz Orchestra, Pablo Gil and Tony Succar) 
 Mas De Mi (Tony Succar)
 Tonada De Succar (Eric Chacón and Tony Succar) 
 Vai La Vai La (Tony Succar Featuring Marcelo Amaro, Tuti and Nelson Arrieta) 
 Andrés Torres, Mauricio Rengifo
 Ay Corazón (Cali y El Dandee) 
 Balas Perdidas (Morat) 
 Cobarde (Ximena Sariñana) 
 Fantasía (Sebastián Yatra) 
 La Plata (Juanes Featuring Lalo Ebratt) 
 Perdón (David Bisbal Featuring Greeicy) 
 Quiero Volver (Tini) 
 Serenata (Mike Bahía) 
 Si Tú Te Vas (Ximena Sariñana) 
 Suave y Sutil (Paulina Rubio) 
 Teléfono (Remix) (Aitana with Lele Pons) 
 Todo En Mi Vida (Ximena Sariñana) 
 Vida (Luis Fonsi) 
 Volver A Verte (Fonseca Featuring Cali y El Dandee) 
 Julio Reyes Copello
 Back In The City (Alejandro Sanz Con Nicky Jam) 
 #Eldisco (Alejandro Sanz) 
 Libre (Diana Fuentes) 
 Mi Persona Favorita (Alejandro Sanz Con Camila Cabello) 
 No Tengo Nada (Alejandro Sanz) 
 Nostalgia (Daniela Brooker) 
 Oxígeno (Malú) 
 Visceral (Paula Arenas) 
 Yo Te Extraño (Sebastián Yatra) 
 Rafa Sardina
 Fandango At The Wall: A Soundtrack For The United States, Mexico, And Beyond (Arturo O'Farrill & The Afro Latin Jazz Orchestra) 
 Indestructible (Flor De Toloache) 
 Volver (Plácido Domingo & Pablo Sainz Villegas) 
 Juan Pablo Vega
 Conexión (Juan Pablo Vega) 
 ¿Dónde Bailarán Las Niñas? (Ximena Sariñana) 
 En Medio De Este Ruido (Kurt) 
 Fuimos Amor (Esteman) 
 Sofía (Mario Bautista) 
 Vida De Mis Vidas (Santiago Cruz y Vicente García)

Music video
Best Short Form Music Video
Kany García and Residente — "Banana Papaya"

Residente, video director; Stephanie "Tuty" Correa, video producer
 Criolo — "Boca de Lobo"
 Denis Cisma and Pedro Inoue, video directors; Beatriz Berjeaut, video producer
 Nego Do Borel featuring DJ Rennan Da Penha — "Me Solta"
 Lucas Romor, video director; KondZilla, video producer
 Nach — "Los Zurdos Mueren Antes"
 Willy Rodriguez, video director; Willy Rodriguez, video producer
 Todo Aparenta Normal — "Vivir Los Colores"
 Mariano Dawidson, video director; Eric Dawidson, video producer

Best Long Form Music Video
Alejandro Sanz — Lo Que Fui Es Lo Que Soy

Mercedes Cantero, Oscar García Blesa, Gervasio Iglesias and Alexis Morante, video directors; Alvaro Agustin, Ghislain Barrois & Gervasio Iglesias, video producers
 Mastodonte — Anatomía de Un Éxodo
 Alfonso Cortés-Cabanillas and Asier Etxeandía, video directors; Jose Luis Huertas and Anibal Ruiz-Villar, video producers
 Astor Piazzolla — Piazzolla, Los Años del Tiburón
 Daniel Rosenfeld, video director; Daniel Rosenfeld, video producer
 Draco Rosa — Hotel de Los Encuentros
 Henry Duarte, José Luis Jiménez, Miguel Jiménez, Draco Rosa, Redamo Rosa and Revel Rosa, video directors; Hector Espinosa, Mio Hachimori, José Luis Jiménez, Miguel Jiménez, Draco Rosa, Revel Rosa & Sadaharu Yagi, video producers
 Carlos Vives — Déjame Quererte
 Juan Pablo Caballero and Felipe Cortés, video directors; Nathalie Burnside, video producer

Special awards
Thalía - President's Merit Award

Controversy
The exclusion of urban entries in the Album, Record, and Song of the Year categories sparked controversy. Colombian singer, J. Balvin started the hashtag #SinReggaetónNoHayGrammyLatino’ (There is no Latin Grammy without Reggaeton) which was soon endorsed by other reggaeton artists such as Daddy Yankee, Becky G, Maite Perroni, Lali Esposito, Tini, Karol G, Natti Natasha, and Anuel AA.

References

External links
 Official Site

2019 in Latin music
2019 in Nevada
2019 music awards
2019
November 2019 events in the United States
Latin Grammy Awards, 20